The 2003 FIA GT Monza 500 km was the tenth and final round the 2003 FIA GT Championship.  It took place at the Autodromo Nazionale Monza, Italy, on 19 October 2003.

Official results
Class winners in bold.  Cars failing to complete 70% of winner's distance marked as Not Classified (NC).

Statistics
 Pole position – #5 Force One Racing Festina – 1:43.559
 Fastest lap – #2 Konrad Motorsport – 1:45.649
 Average speed – 188.720 km/h

References

 
 
 

M
FIA GT